Julia Hartley-Brewer is an English radio presenter, political journalist and newspaper columnist. She hosts the weekday breakfast radio show on Talkradio.

Early life
Julia Hartley-Brewer's father, Michael John Hartley-Brewer, stood unsuccessfully as the Labour Party candidate in Selly Oak in the 1970 general election. Her mother was a general practitioner.

Hartley-Brewer was educated at Oldfield Girls' Comprehensive School in Bath and Woodhouse Sixth Form College in Finchley, north London. She gained a degree in philosophy, politics and economics (PPE)  at Magdalen College, Oxford. She later studied for a diploma in journalism at Cardiff University's School of Journalism.

Career
Hartley-Brewer began her career in journalism at the East London Advertiser in Bethnal Green, east London. Later, she was employed as a news reporter and political correspondent for the London Evening Standard and then joined The Guardian, staying at the latter until September 2000. She then moved to the Sunday Express as political correspondent, then political editor from 2001 until 2007 and then Assistant Editor (Politics), writing a weekly opinion column. She left the Sunday Express in February 2011.

In 2006, she presented and narrated two political documentaries for the television channels BBC Two and BBC Four about the history of British Deputy Prime Ministers, called Every Prime Minister Needs a Willie, and the history of the Leader of the Opposition in The Worst Job in Politics.

She was an LBC presenter from February 2011, until she left in December 2014 to be replaced by Shelagh Fogarty.

Hartley-Brewer now broadcasts on Talkradio, a talk radio station owned by Rupert Murdoch's News Corp. She presented the mid-morning weekday show from March 2016 until 15 January 2018, when she moved to host the weekday breakfast show from 6.30am to 10am. In September 2019, The Julia Hartley-Brewer Show was launched on YouTube under the Talkradio brand; each programme is a one-to-one interview with a guest. The show became a daily simulcast as part of the daily schedule of TalkTV that began broadcasting in April 2022.

She has written opinion articles and columns for publications such as The Daily Telegraph, The Mail on Sunday and The Spectator about politics and current affairs.

Public appearances

She has appeared as a panellist on the comedy quiz show Have I Got News for You ten times, as well as being a regular panellist on BBC One's Question Time and Radio 4's Any Questions. She is a regular pundit and commentator on TV and radio, including for Sky News, the BBC News Channel, BBC One's The One Show, ITV's Tonight show, Lorraine on ITV, This Morning on ITV, The Agenda on ITV, Sunday Politics on BBC1, BBC Radio 5 Live and BBC Radio 4's Today and PM programmes. She was a contestant on Pointless Celebrities in October 2014, winning the prize for her chosen charity.

Other

In June 2016, Hartley-Brewer said Owen Jones had "more in common with ISIS than he thinks" on Sky News after Jones walked out of an interview on the news channel following host Mark Longhurst's refusal to refer to the Orlando nightclub shooting as an assault on LGBT people. Hartley-Brewer also said, "neither the Sky presenter Mark Longhurst nor I said anything that was offensive, wrong or bigoted in any way" and that she would not apologise and criticised Sky News for apologising to Jones. By lunchtime of the following day of the interview and the comments by Hartley-Brewer, Ofcom had received almost 60 complaints about the programme saying both Hartley-Brewer and Longhurst were dismissive of Jones’s argument that the attack was one on the LGBT community.

In October 2017, Hartley-Brewer alleged that the then Defence Secretary, Sir Michael Fallon, had repeatedly touched her knee throughout a dinner in 2002; the allegation contributed to his eventual resignation.

On 12 August 2018, she sent a tweet containing a photo of the aftermath of the 1998 Omagh bombing with text saying that Jeremy Corbyn had paid tribute to the victims of the bombing, "including the Real IRA bombers who may have snagged a nail while planting the explosives". The tweet was criticised as insensitive by Michael Gallagher, whose son Aidan was killed by the bomb. He said that while he wouldn't have "much faith" in Corbyn, her tweet was "poorly timed". Writer Lisa McGee criticised the use of the photo of the aftermath. Hartley-Brewer was also criticised by journalist David Blevins. She defended her tweet as satire.

In late 2019, Jolyon Maugham accused Hartley-Brewer of revealing his home address at a time when he was receiving death threats. Hartley-Brewer defended herself by saying Maugham's address was already easily available online and that he had previously revealed it himself in published interviews.

On 28 December 2022, Hartley-Brewer caused controversy when referencing environmental activist Greta Thunberg's autism in a tweet, following Thunberg's criticism of internet personality Andrew Tate. The tweet was posted again without mentioning autism.

Views

Hartley-Brewer was a long-standing supporter of Brexit during the campaign in 2016.  On 29 March 2019, Hartley-Brewer spoke at the Leave Means Leave rally in Parliament Square, London.

She has declared that she is an atheist. In 2010, she described herself as a "staunch and long-standing republican". She is an honorary associate of the National Secular Society.

In September 2014 discussing the climate crisis, Hartley-Brewer tweeted: "I am not a flat earther. If there were any evidence that man is affecting climate change, I would accept that fact. There isn't." She has stated that there is no scientific foundation for claims of imminent climate catastrophe, claiming that those who believe that there is one are "part of a doomsday cult," and calling Extinction Rebellion "a sort of quasi-religious death cult." She has also stated that climate models "so far have failed to predict anything correctly" and that the science of climate change is "an as-yet unproven theory" and therefore open to challenge, "which is standard practice in science." As a guest on the BBC's Question Time in November 2022, Hartley-Brewer dismissed the climate crisis as 'weather' 

At the Oxford University PPE Society on 20 November 2018, Hartley-Brewer gave a talk on "Political Correctness and Free Speech", in which she argued that political correctness damaged the ability to freely express political views.

Hartley-Brewer has been referred to as "right-wing" by Nick Duffy writing for PinkNews. Duffy reported that Hartley-Brewer threatened to remove a guest from the radio studio where she works as a presenter (for Talkradio) on 30 November 2018 during a discussion on trans rights because the guest used the term "cis." Hartley-Brewer said on the radio show that it was a "very big risk" for women to be "kept in cells alongside people who are biologically men" and that "if you are physically intact as a man, you are not in a woman's prison, end of. Nothing to discuss." Guest Steve Allen responded, "if you are in a woman's prison, you should be safe from being physically attacked, by a cis or a trans woman. Everyone should be safe in prison." Hartley-Brewer responded by saying, "you're not allowed to come on my show and say a cis or a trans woman. A woman or a trans woman. I'm not a cis woman… we are women. We are biologically women. I'm not going to have that BBC claptrap on my show." When Allen offered to use the term "non-trans women" she said, "if you say that, I'm going to ask you to leave my studio. I'm absolutely serious. I'm not having it." A later article in 2021 for PinkNews by Lily Wakefield referred to Hartley-Brewer as having "openly voiced her anti-trans views" in reference to the article by Duffy.

The Royal College of General Practitioners invited her to speak in an "NHS Question Time" panel debate at its annual conference in 2019 but withdrew the invitation after over 700 GPs signed a petition complaining that her views were not conducive to the work they were doing to promote inclusivity within the profession and among patients. One of such views involved a deleted tweet from 2016, in which Hartley-Brewer said "Powell wasn't a racist". On Enoch Powell, she said "I'm not defending Powell, I just don't see anything in the Rivers speech that he got wrong.".

In April 2021, Ofcom received over 200 complaints accusing Hartley-Brewer of trivialising racism following a TV appearance in which Hartley-Brewer commented on a family portrait of Queen Elizabeth II and Prince Philip taken 2018, posing with seven of their great-grandchildren, saying 'I wonder if Meghan [Markle] has managed to take offence to this photograph that doesn't include her son. Well she probably thinks it's a racist photograph, taken before her son was even conceived' (Archie, the son of Meghan Markle and Prince Harry was born in 2019). She added. 'I'm sure she's managed to take offence at it anyway.'

Personal life
Hartley-Brewer is married with one daughter, born in 2006.

References

External links

Alumni of Cardiff University
Alumni of Magdalen College, Oxford
British Eurosceptics
British political commentators
British women journalists
Daily Express people
Daily Mail and General Trust people
The Daily Telegraph people
English atheists
English columnists
English journalists
English political journalists
English radio presenters
English republicans
The Guardian people
LBC radio presenters
Living people
London Evening Standard people
People from Bath, Somerset
People from Birmingham, West Midlands
The Spectator people
Year of birth missing (living people)